Drunktown's Finest is an American drama film directed by Sydney Freeland. The film had its world premiere at the 2014 Sundance Film Festival on January 18, 2014. The film later screened at the Sundance London Film Festival on April 25, 2014.

The film was acquired by Sundance Channel after its premiere at Sundance Film Festival and was scheduled to broadcast in 2014.

Plot
Three young Navajo Native Americans - an adopted Native girl, a young father-to-be, and a trans woman who dreams of being a model - strive to escape the hardships of life on an Indian reservation. Nizhoni seeks out her past, well after being adopted by a white Christian family, Felixia, a trans woman, pursues a spot in the "women of the tribe" calendar, and Sickboy is headed to basic training so he can take care of his soon-to-be-born child.

Cast
Jeremiah Bitsui as Luther SickBoy Maryboy
Carmen Moore as Felixia
Morningstar Angeline as Nizhoni Smiles
Kiowa Gordon as Julius
Shauna Baker as Karah
Elizabeth Frances as Angela Maryboy

Reception
Drunktown's Finest received positive reviews from critics. Geoff Berkshire of Variety wrote that "Freeland takes her time bringing her characters together, allowing the audience an opportunity to marinate in the unique experiences of each individual first. The slow-burn approach is smartly executed, and the intersecting plotlines veer toward schematic only during Sick Boy and Felixia’s chance encounter at a grocery store, which leads to an eventful night out." John DeFore in his review for The Hollywood Reporter praised the film by saying that "Native American themes get a fresh look in three-handed drama." Gary Green of HeyUGuys gave the film three stars, calling it "A low-budget picture with bigger things on its mind."

References

External links
 Official website
 
 

2014 films
American drama films
2014 drama films
Films about Native Americans
Films scored by Mark Orton
American LGBT-related films
LGBT-related drama films
2014 LGBT-related films
Films about trans women
2010s English-language films
2014 directorial debut films
2010s American films